Saint Luke's Protestant Episcopal Church (St. Luke's Episcopal Church) is a historic church at 2304 Second Avenue in Kearney, Nebraska.  It was designed by Chicago architect John Sutcliffe and was built in 1908.  It was added to the National Register in 1986.

Its NRHP nomination asserted that it "is locally significant as a fine example of the late Gothic Revival style of architecture, not readily found in Buffalo County, Nebraska" and that its "interior is especially notable as it typifies old English church architecture."

References

Episcopal church buildings in Nebraska
Churches on the National Register of Historic Places in Nebraska
Gothic Revival church buildings in Nebraska
Churches completed in 1908
Buildings and structures in Kearney, Nebraska
National Register of Historic Places in Buffalo County, Nebraska
1908 establishments in Nebraska